Checkpoint 300, also known as the Bethlehem checkpoint, the Gilo Checkpoint, or the Rachel's Tomb checkpoint, is a major Israel Defense Forces checkpoint at one of the main exits of Bethlehem. It is the best known of all Israeli checkpoints, due to its location on the tourist route between Jerusalem and Bethlehem.

The crossing in its current format was established in 2005.

In March 2016, Israeli newspaper Yedioth Ahronoth criticized the overcrowding at the checkpoint and the attitude of the Israeli authorities towards the Palestinians. In December 2020, the Association for Civil Rights in Israel filed a petition to the Israeli Supreme Court on the same topic. Israeli human-rights association Machsom Watch has also criticized the conditions of the Bethlehem checkpoint.

See also
 Palestinian freedom of movement

References

West Bank
Israeli–Palestinian conflict
Checkpoints